Manuel María Arias Domínguez (born 26 April 1956 in Riaño, León, Spain) better known as Imanol Arias, is a Spanish actor and film director.

Career
Imanol Arias began his career with a travelling theatre group performing in the Basque Country of northern Spain. He debuted on TV in 1976 and his first film was Humberto Solás's Cecilia (1982). In 1987 he won the prize at the San Sebastian Film Festival for the role of Eleuterio Sánchez in El Lute: Run for Your Life (El Lute: camina o revienta, 1987).

Since 1976 he has appeared in some 70 different films and TV programmes.

In 1996 he made his film debut as director in Un asunto privado. The only other work he directed was a TV programme in 1989.

Currently, he appears in the TVE prize-winning series Cuéntame cómo pasó (Tell me how it happened) in the role of the father of a Spanish middle-class family, during the last years of Spain's Francoist government and the transition to democracy.

In 2013 Arias worked on the Spanish dubbing of the video game Battlefield 4 as Captain Roland Garrison.

At Gijón International Film Festival in 2014, he received the Nacho Martinez Award.

Imanol Arias is Ambassador for UNICEF.

On 7 April 2016, Imanol Arias was accused of tax evasion and money laundering in the Panama Papers scandal as the owner of an offshore company, Trekel Trading Limited, based on the island nation of Niue that held a bank account under his complete control at the Swiss bank Banque Franck SA.

Filmography
 La corea, by Pedro Olea (1976)
 Elisita, by Juan Caño Arecha (1980)
 Cecilia (1982)
 Laberinto de pasiones, by Pedro Almodóvar (1982)
 Demonios en el Jardín, by Manuel Gutiérrez Aragón
 La colmena, by Mario Camus (1982)
 Bearn o la sala de las muñecas, by Jaime Chávarri (1983)
 Camila, by María Luisa Bemberg (1984)
 Fuego Eterno, by José Ángel Rebolledo (1984)
 La Muerte de Mikel, by Imanol Uribe (1984)
 Lulú de noche, by Emilio Martínez Lázaro (1985)
 Bandera Negra, by Pedro Olea (1986)
 Tiempo de silencio, by Vicente Aranda (1986)
 El Lute: camina o revienta, by Vicente Aranda (1987)
 Divinas palabras, by José Luis García Sánchez (1987)
 El Lute II: mañana seré libre, by Vicente Aranda (1988)
 A solas contigo, by Eduardo Campoy (1990)
 Veraz, by Xavier Castano (1991)
 Una mujer bajo la lluvia, by Gerardo Vera (1992)
 El Amante Bilingüe, by Vicente Aranda (1993)
 Tierno verano de lujurias y azoteas, by Jaime Chávarri (1993)
 Intruso, by Vicente Aranda (1993)
 Sálvate si puedes, by Joaquín Trincado (1994)
 Todos los hombres sois iguales, by Manuel Gómez Pereira (1994)
 La leyenda de Balthasar, el castrado, by Juan Miñón (1994)
 La flor de mi secreto, by Pedro Almodóvar (1995)
 A tres bandas, by Enrico Coletti (1996)
 Territorio comanche, by Gerardo Herrero (1996)
 Ilona llega con la lluvia, by Sergio Cabrera (1996)
 Rigor mortis, by Koldo Azkarreta (1996)
 En brazos de la mujer madura, by Manuel Lombardero (1996)
 África, by Alfonso Ungría (1996)
 Buenos Aires me mata, by Beda Docampo Feijóo (1997)
 Quiero morir, by Toni Meca (2000)
 Esperando al mesías, by Daniel Burman (2000)
 La voz de su amo, by Emilio Martínez Lázaro (2000)
 Una casa con vista al mar, by Alberto Arvelo (2001)
 Salvajes, by Carlos Molinero (2001)
 Besos de gato, by Rafael Alcázar (2003)
 Laura, by Tote Trenas (2004)
 La semana que viene (sin falta), de Josetxo San Mateo (2006)
 Lo que tiene el otro, by Miguel Perelló (2007)
 Nocturna, una aventura mágica, by Víctor Maldonado y Adrià García (2007)
 Pájaros de papel, by Emilio Aragón (2010)
 My First Wedding (2011)
 Anacleto: agente secreto, by Javier Ruiz Caldera (2015)
De sable et de feu, by Souheil Ben-Barka (2019)
The Legacy of the Bones, by Fernando González Molina (2019)
 Ofrenda a la tormenta, by Fernando González Molina (2020)
 Retrato de mujer blanca con pelo cano y arrugas, by Ivan Ruiz Flores (2020)

Television 
 Cervantes (1981)
 Juanita la larga (1982)
 Anillos de oro (1983)
 Brigada Central (1989)
 Brigada Central 2: La guerra blanca (1993)
 Querido maestro (1997)
 Camino de Santiago (1999)
 Dime que me quieres (2001)
 Severo Ochoa: la conquista del Nobel (2001)
 Cuéntame cómo pasó (2001–)
 Atrapados (2003)
 Mentiras (2005)
 Un país para comérselo (2010–)
 Velvet Colección (2017)
La última palabra, by Ivan Mazza (2020)

References

External links 

 

1956 births
Living people
People from Montaña de Riaño
Spanish male television actors
Male actors from Castile and León
Spanish male film actors
Spanish film directors
Film directors from Castile and León
People named in the Panama Papers